Saara Lamberg is a Finnish and Australian filmmaker, director, writer, producer and actor currently working in Australia. Her most notable work to date is the feature film Innuendo (written, directed and produced by Lamberg), which was released theatrically in October 2017 in Melbourne. Innuendo has been compared with works of David Lynch, Yorgos Lanthimos, and Roman Polanski

Biography
Lamberg studied in Dartington College of Arts, England, and graduated with a BA (HonsS) Theatre and Choreographic Practices degree in 2007. In 2010 she entered the new 'Artist in Residence' programme in Australia's oldest art centre, Montsalvat based in Eltham. and made Melbourne her home, becoming a dual citizen in 2014.

Lamberg won the Bronze prize at the Beverly Hills screenplay contest (Hollywood 2013), Best Actor at Comfy Shorts (Melbourne 2014), Best Drama at the Connect Film Festival (Melbourne 2014) and Best Actor (Lithuania 2004). Her first feature Innuendo won the Best Feature at the Fine Arts Film Festival in California  and the Audience Award for Best Australian film by Cinema Australia. The film has its European premiere at the Rencontres Internationales du Cinéma des Antipodes in October 2017 

The Movie Blog described Innuendo as "a very important piece of Aussie cinema", Film Ink "true original"  and Chelle's inferno "an instant classic in Australian cinema".

Innuendo is distributed by Umbrella Entertainment in Australia  and represented by Blairwood Entertainment for international sales.

Lamberg wrote, directed and produced five short films before she launched onto the production of Innuendo.
In 2017 she also started the production of her second feature film, Westermarck Effect.

References

Further reading 

http://buzzmagazine.com.au/innuendo-saara-lamberg-interview/
http://www.bigtreeon7th.com/blog/2017/4/17/saara-lamberg
https://www.broadwayworld.com/australia-melbourne/article/Take-a-Walk-On-The-Wild-Side-with-INNUENDO-20171010

External links 
 

Year of birth missing (living people)
Living people
Australian actors
Australian film producers
Australian writers
21st-century Finnish actresses
Actresses from Helsinki
Film people from Helsinki
Finnish emigrants to Australia
Finnish expatriates in England
Finnish filmmakers